Tipuana tipu, also known as tipa, rosewood and pride of Bolivia, is a South American tree. It is the only member of the genus Tipuana. It was recently assigned to the informal monophyletic Pterocarpus clade within the Dalbergieae.

Physical characteristics

Depending on where it is grown, Tipuana is largely a deciduous tree, annually shedding all or most of its leaves and large "helicopter" pods from midwinter to spring. Timber is whitish in color, strong and fibrous.

Invasiveness
Tipuana tipu is viewed as an invasive weed in some countries and is known for having a very aggressive root system. The tree roots can easily lift up concrete and asphalt. Precautions should be taken when planting near buildings, homes, or pools, as they are likely to be damaged. Damage may sometimes be averted by trenching near the structure to a depth of about 1 metre and filling the trench with building rubble or lining the trench with thick plastic sheeting or corrugated roofing sheets.

Listed as a Category 3 Invasive species in South Africa.
[Category 3 = Species regarded as having the proven potential of becoming invasive, not allowed to occur anywhere except in biological control reserves, unless they were already in existence when the regulations went into effect. The conditions on which these already existing plants may be retained are that they do not grow within 30 m from the 1:50 year flood line of watercourses or wetlands, that all reasonable steps are taken to keep the plant from spreading, and that the Executive Officer has the power to impose additional conditions or even prohibit the growing in any area where he has reason to believe that these plants will pose a threat to agricultural resources. 
Propagative material of these plants, such as seeds or cuttings, may no longer be planted, propagated, imported, bought, sold or traded in any way. It will, however, be legal to trade in the wood of Category 3 plants, or in other products that do not have the potential to grow or multiply.]

Insects
The species is a food plant for spittlebugs such as Ptyelus grossus. In Southern California, an insect called tipu psyllid (Platycorypha nigrivirga) has invaded several trees.

References

Dalbergieae
Monotypic Fabaceae genera
Trees of Brazil
Trees of Argentina
Trees of Paraguay
Ornamental trees
Drought-tolerant trees